Scandinavian studies is an interdisciplinary academic field of area studies, mainly in the United States and Germany, that primarily focuses on the Scandinavian languages (also known as North Germanic languages) and cultural studies pertaining to Scandinavia and Scandinavian language and culture in the other Nordic countries. While Scandinavia is defined as Denmark, Norway and Sweden, the term Scandinavian in an ethnic, cultural and linguistic sense is often used synonymously with North Germanic and also refers to the peoples and languages of the Faroe Islands and Iceland; furthermore a minority in Finland are ethnically Scandinavian and speak Swedish natively.

Scandinavian studies does not exist as a separate field within Scandinavia or the Nordic countries themselves, as its scope would be considered far too broad to be treated meaningfully within a single discipline. The closest related field in Scandinavia would be the more narrow discipline of Nordic linguistics, which covers North Germanic languages. A major focus of Scandinavian studies is the teaching of Scandinavian languages, especially the three large languages Danish, Norwegian and Swedish.

Overview

Scandinavian studies principally focuses on Danish, Norwegian and Swedish philology, especially linguistics, history and cultural studies. Denmark, Norway and Sweden form Scandinavia according to the definition prevalent in Scandinavia itself and their majority peoples are Scandinavians in the ethnic sense who speak Scandinavian languages in the linguistic sense. Scandinavian studies usually also covers Icelandic and Faroese philology, and philology as it relates to the Swedish minority in Finland. The field is also home to research related to the Scandinavian diaspora as well as regions affected by Scandinavian colonialism.

In Germany Scandinavian studies (Skandinavistik) is defined as a subfield of Germanic languages, and covering Danish, Norwegian, Swedish, Faroese and Icelandic languages as well as accompanying literature and culture.

Universities offering education and performing research in Scandinavian studies are located throughout North America and in parts of Europe. Learned societies within the field include the Society for the Advancement of Scandinavian Study (SASS) with its quarterly journal Scandinavian Studies, the International Association of Scandinavian Studies (IASS), and the Association for the Advancement of Scandinavian Studies in Canada (AASSC).

Departments of Scandinavian studies in the United States are found at the University of California, Berkeley, the University of Washington, and the University of Wisconsin–Madison. University College London and the University of Edinburgh are home to the only extant full departments of Scandinavian studies in the UK, while other institutions, such as the University of Aberdeen, have specialized research institutions for Scandinavian Studies.

At some universities in the United States Scandinavian studies is placed in the same department as Baltic studies, although the Baltic states, their cultures and languages are as unrelated to Scandinavia and Scandinavian languages as they are to English. In contrast, Baltic studies is commonly grouped together with Slavic or Eastern European studies at Scandinavian universities such as the University of Oslo, and is regarded as completely unrelated to Scandinavian studies.

References

External links

Brigham Young College of Humanities, Scandinavian Studies, Brigham Young University
Fachverband Skandinavistik, Germany
Kompetenznetzwerk Skandinavistik, Germany

 
Germanic studies